The Judo competition at the 1980 Summer Olympics was the first time that the medal count was not dominated by Japan, since the country joined the boycott of the games because of the 1979 Soviet invasion of Afghanistan. Medals were awarded to male judoka in eight competitions, seven weight classes and the open competition — two more than in 1976. All events were held at the Palace of Sports of the Central Lenin Stadium at Luzhniki (south western part of Moscow). The schedule started on July 27 and ended on August 2.

Medal summary

Participating nations
A total of 182 judokas from 42 nations competed at the Moscow Games

Medal table

References

External links
 
 
 Sports123.com

 
1980 Summer Olympics events
O
1980
Judo competitions in Russia